The Tyler Branch is a tributary of the Missisquoi River, flowing successively in Bakersfield, Enosburg and in Sheldon, in Franklin County, in northern Vermont, in the United States.

The valley of the Tyler Branch is served by Tyler Branch Road passing on the northeastern shore of the river. The upper part is served by Horsehore Circle street and Enosburg Mountain Road.

The surface of the Tyler Branch is usually frozen from mid-December to mid-March, except the rapids areas; however, safe circulation on the ice is generally from late December to early March.

Course

The course of the river follows more or less the Tyler Branch Road, according to the following segments:

  towards southwest descending the slope of the mountain, then branching to the northwest, crossing the Enosburg Mountain Road, up to Cold Hollow Brook (coming from southeast);
  towards northwest in Bakersfield, entering in Enosburg, up to Beaver Meadow Brook (coming from north-east);
  towards northwest in Bakersfield receiving three brooks (from the northeast), then curving to the southeast, up to Bogue Brook (coming from south);
  towards the northwest, branching west up to The Branch (coming from south);
  towards the northwest going in agricultural area entering in Sheldon, forming a curve towards southwest, up to the mouth.

From there, the current goes generally westward on  following the Missisquoi River up to eastern shore of Lake Champlain.

Toponymy 
The toponym "Tyler Branch" was registered on October 29, 1980, in the USGS (US Geological Survey).

See also
Franklin County, Vermont
Missisquoi River
Lake Champlain
Richelieu River
List of rivers of Vermont

References

Rivers of Vermont
Rivers of Franklin County, Vermont